The lesser golden plover is the name for the composite species of birds which is now regarded as two separate species: 

American golden plover
Pacific golden plover